Avicularia avicularia, sometimes called the pinktoe tarantula, is a species of tarantula native from Venezuela, Guyana, Suriname, French Guiana and Trinidad and Tobago to Peru, Bolivia and Brazil. This species is sometimes called the Guyana pinktoe, or South American pinktoe.

Description 
The mature pinktoe tarantula has a dark-colored body and pinkish feet, hence its name. Juvenile specimens, however, have pinkish bodies and dark-colored feet and undergo a reversal in their coloration as they approach adulthood at 4–5 years. A fully grown Pinktoe tarantula can grow up to six inches in length.  They have a short lifespan, with males living 2–3 years, and females living between 6–9 years. 

Dimorphism has been shown in the mature stages of males and females, with males having uniformly barbed urticating hairs, while females are found only at the proximal end. Mature males also exhibit a pair of hooks on the last segment of the pedipalps, used during construction of "sperm webs" and courtship behaviors.

Ecology 
They are an ambush predator, using webbing as a trap and to sense movement from prey. With an enriched environment, they can display an array of behaviors such as active hunting, foraging, and even construction such as nest and tunnel building with nearby debris. The pinktoe tarantula consumes mostly insect prey and is an aggressive feeder. Some of its prey includes crickets, wax moths, grasshoppers, cockroaches and small tree frogs. They sometimes consume small lizards such as Anolis, but vertebrates usually are not a major contributor to its diet.

Common threat-responses include running or leaping away, but they may react aggressively if provoked. Defensive mechanisms include type II urticating hairs (which must be transferred via direct contact, rather than kicking the hairs into the air), propelling feces toward perceived threats, adopting a threat posture, and biting. Their venom is considered mild, even compared to other new-world tarantulas. Females are also shown to display sexual cannibalism.

Husbandry 
Being arboreal species, they require a relatively tall habitat with plenty of climbing space in captivity.  Despite common belief, this species should be kept on dry substrate with a water dish to achieve adequate humidity while also giving cross ventilation. This prevents stagnant air, bacteria, and excessive humidity from forming which can be fatal.

See also
 Antilles pinktoe tarantula
 10 Essential Pink Toe Tarantula Care Tips for Beginners

References

External links

 Avicularia avicularia photos in tarantulas gallery
 Avicularia avicularia on the Tarantupedia

Theraphosidae
Spiders of Central America
Spiders of South America
Spiders of the Caribbean
Spiders described in 1758
Taxa named by Carl Linnaeus